Bagh-e-Jinnah may refer to:

 Bagh-e-Jinnah, Lahore
 Bagh-e-Jinnah, Karachi
 Bagh-e-Jinnah, Faisalabad